The Barabinsk constituency (No.138) is a Russian legislative constituency in Novosibirsk Oblast. Until 2007, the constituency was based in central and western Novosibirsk Oblast, covering most of rural territory of the region. During 2015 redistricting, the constituency was heavily gerrymandered, so it currently snakes from Novosibirsk through the middle of Novosibirsk Oblast all the way to the west.

Members elected

Election results

1993

|-
! colspan=2 style="background-color:#E9E9E9;text-align:left;vertical-align:top;" |Candidate
! style="background-color:#E9E9E9;text-align:left;vertical-align:top;" |Party
! style="background-color:#E9E9E9;text-align:right;" |Votes
! style="background-color:#E9E9E9;text-align:right;" |%
|-
|style="background-color:"|
|align=left|Nikolay Kharitonov
|align=left|Agrarian Party
|
|54.21%
|-
|style="background-color:"|
|align=left|Igor Malkov
|align=left|Yavlinsky–Boldyrev–Lukin
| -
|16.40%
|-
| colspan="5" style="background-color:#E9E9E9;"|
|- style="font-weight:bold"
| colspan="3" style="text-align:left;" | Total
| 
| 100%
|-
| colspan="5" style="background-color:#E9E9E9;"|
|- style="font-weight:bold"
| colspan="4" |Source:
|
|}

1995

|-
! colspan=2 style="background-color:#E9E9E9;text-align:left;vertical-align:top;" |Candidate
! style="background-color:#E9E9E9;text-align:left;vertical-align:top;" |Party
! style="background-color:#E9E9E9;text-align:right;" |Votes
! style="background-color:#E9E9E9;text-align:right;" |%
|-
|style="background-color:"|
|align=left|Nikolay Kharitonov (incumbent)
|align=left|Agrarian Party
|
|35.05%
|-
|style="background-color:"|
|align=left|Aleksandr Donchenko
|align=left|Communist Party
|
|20.59%
|-
|style="background-color:"|
|align=left|Andrey Dorovsky
|align=left|Liberal Democratic Party
|
|15.79%
|-
|style="background-color:#F5821F"|
|align=left|Vitaly Trunov
|align=left|Bloc of Independents
|
|8.53%
|-
|style="background-color:"|
|align=left|Viktor Nozdryukhin
|align=left|Our Home – Russia
|
|6.52%
|-
|style="background-color:#000000"|
|colspan=2 |against all
|
|10.88%
|-
| colspan="5" style="background-color:#E9E9E9;"|
|- style="font-weight:bold"
| colspan="3" style="text-align:left;" | Total
| 
| 100%
|-
| colspan="5" style="background-color:#E9E9E9;"|
|- style="font-weight:bold"
| colspan="4" |Source:
|
|}

1999

|-
! colspan=2 style="background-color:#E9E9E9;text-align:left;vertical-align:top;" |Candidate
! style="background-color:#E9E9E9;text-align:left;vertical-align:top;" |Party
! style="background-color:#E9E9E9;text-align:right;" |Votes
! style="background-color:#E9E9E9;text-align:right;" |%
|-
|style="background-color:"|
|align=left|Nikolay Kharitonov (incumbent)
|align=left|Communist Party
|
|53.34%
|-
|style="background-color:"|
|align=left|Yevgeny Loginov
|align=left|Liberal Democratic Party
|
|13.93%
|-
|style="background-color:"|
|align=left|Aleksandr Melnik
|align=left|Independent
|
|11.05%
|-
|style="background-color:"|
|align=left|Aleksandr Panin
|align=left|Yabloko
|
|6.63%
|-
|style="background-color:#084284"|
|align=left|Mikhail Fedotov
|align=left|Spiritual Heritage
|
|2.35%
|-
|style="background-color:#FF4400"|
|align=left|Yevgeny Sokolkov
|align=left|Andrey Nikolayev and Svyatoslav Fyodorov Bloc
|
|1.67%
|-
|style="background-color:#000000"|
|colspan=2 |against all
|
|8.30%
|-
| colspan="5" style="background-color:#E9E9E9;"|
|- style="font-weight:bold"
| colspan="3" style="text-align:left;" | Total
| 
| 100%
|-
| colspan="5" style="background-color:#E9E9E9;"|
|- style="font-weight:bold"
| colspan="4" |Source:
|
|}

2003

|-
! colspan=2 style="background-color:#E9E9E9;text-align:left;vertical-align:top;" |Candidate
! style="background-color:#E9E9E9;text-align:left;vertical-align:top;" |Party
! style="background-color:#E9E9E9;text-align:right;" |Votes
! style="background-color:#E9E9E9;text-align:right;" |%
|-
|style="background-color:"|
|align=left|Nikolay Kharitonov (incumbent)
|align=left|Communist Party
|
|56.40%
|-
|style="background-color:"|
|align=left|Yevgeny Loginov
|align=left|Liberal Democratic Party
|
|11.82%
|-
|style="background-color:"|
|align=left|Natalya Melnichenko
|align=left|Agrarian Party
|
|5.65%
|-
|style="background:#1042A5"| 
|align=left|Anatoly Gvozdev
|align=left|Union of Right Forces
|
|4.93%
|-
|style="background-color:"|
|align=left|Boris Mironov
|align=left|Independent
|
|2.87%
|-
|style="background-color:"|
|align=left|Yury Kargapolov
|align=left|Independent
|
|2.52%
|-
|style="background-color:#000000"|
|colspan=2 |against all
|
|12.49%
|-
| colspan="5" style="background-color:#E9E9E9;"|
|- style="font-weight:bold"
| colspan="3" style="text-align:left;" | Total
| 
| 100%
|-
| colspan="5" style="background-color:#E9E9E9;"|
|- style="font-weight:bold"
| colspan="4" |Source:
|
|}

2016

|-
! colspan=2 style="background-color:#E9E9E9;text-align:left;vertical-align:top;" |Candidate
! style="background-color:#E9E9E9;text-align:left;vertical-align:top;" |Party
! style="background-color:#E9E9E9;text-align:right;" |Votes
! style="background-color:#E9E9E9;text-align:right;" |%
|-
|style="background-color: " |
|align=left|Viktor Ignatov
|align=left|United Russia
|
|39.19%
|-
|style="background-color:"|
|align=left|Roman Yakovlev
|align=left|Communist Party
|
|16.70%
|-
|style="background-color:"|
|align=left|Dmitry Golovanev
|align=left|Liberal Democratic Party
|
|15.80%
|-
|style="background-color:"|
|align=left|Aleksandr Vandakurov
|align=left|A Just Russia
|
|7.36%
|-
|style="background:"| 
|align=left|Olga Shmendel
|align=left|Communists of Russia
|
|6.11%
|-
|style="background-color:"|
|align=left|Dmitry Lukashev
|align=left|Rodina
|
|3.70%
|-
|style="background-color:"|
|align=left|Dmitry Kholyavchenko
|align=left|Yabloko
|
|2.05%
|-
|style="background:"| 
|align=left|Bulat Barantayev
|align=left|People's Freedom Party
|
|1.95%
|-
|style="background:"| 
|align=left|Dmitry Popov
|align=left|Patriots of Russia
|
|1.56%
|-
| colspan="5" style="background-color:#E9E9E9;"|
|- style="font-weight:bold"
| colspan="3" style="text-align:left;" | Total
| 
| 100%
|-
| colspan="5" style="background-color:#E9E9E9;"|
|- style="font-weight:bold"
| colspan="4" |Source:
|
|}

2021

|-
! colspan=2 style="background-color:#E9E9E9;text-align:left;vertical-align:top;" |Candidate
! style="background-color:#E9E9E9;text-align:left;vertical-align:top;" |Party
! style="background-color:#E9E9E9;text-align:right;" |Votes
! style="background-color:#E9E9E9;text-align:right;" |%
|-
|style="background-color: " |
|align=left|Viktor Ignatov (incumbent)
|align=left|United Russia
|
|35.88%
|-
|style="background-color:"|
|align=left|Roman Yakovlev
|align=left|Communist Party
|
|28.31%
|-
|style="background-color: " |
|align=left|Timur Gostyayev
|align=left|New People
|
|8.23%
|-
|style="background-color: "|
|align=left|Eduard Kozhemyakin
|align=left|Party of Pensioners
|
|7.08%
|-
|style="background-color:"|
|align=left|Roman Kazakov
|align=left|Liberal Democratic Party
|
|6.82%
|-
|style="background-color:"|
|align=left|Andrey Filimoshkin
|align=left|A Just Russia — For Truth
|
|5.47%
|-
|style="background:"| 
|align=left|Tatyana Samkova
|align=left|Party of Growth
|
|2.87%
|-
|style="background:"| 
|align=left|Maksim Teppo
|align=left|Civic Platform
|
|0.64%
|-
| colspan="5" style="background-color:#E9E9E9;"|
|- style="font-weight:bold"
| colspan="3" style="text-align:left;" | Total
| 
| 100%
|-
| colspan="5" style="background-color:#E9E9E9;"|
|- style="font-weight:bold"
| colspan="4" |Source:
|
|}

Notes

References

Russian legislative constituencies
Politics of Novosibirsk Oblast